Dainan is a town under the administration of Xinghua City in east-central Jiangsu province, China. It has 4 residential communities and 33 villages under its administration. Part of that area is known as the "cradle of stainless steel" production, and this economic activity gives rise to the nickname "No. 1 Town of Central Jiangsu".

References 

Township-level divisions of Jiangsu